The Laoshan Bicycle Moto Cross (BMX) was one of 9 temporary venues used for the 2008 Summer Olympics. It was located in Laoshan, Shijingshan District, Beijing. The venue was used for the men's and women's BMX racing events.
The arena has in recent years been transformed into decay.

References
Beijing2008.cn profile.

Venues of the 2008 Summer Olympics
Defunct sports venues in China
Olympic cycling venues
Sports venues in Beijing
BMX tracks